Antonino Bernardini (born 21 June 1974) is an Italian football manager and former footballer, who played as a midfielder.

Club career
Bernardini started his career at Roma. He played his first Serie A games on 19 February 1995 against Calcio Padova. In summer 1996 he returned to A.S. Roma and transferred to Perugia at Serie B next season. He won promotion with team which finished 4th. He played twice for Perugia at Serie A before joined the league rival Salernitana in October 1998. In summer 1999 he was signed by Vicenza of Serie B and won promotion again as champion. But in the following season he followed the team relegated back to Serie B. In July 2003, he was signed by league rival Atalanta which newly relegated along with teammate Michele Marcolini. In exchange, Vicenza hired Julien Rantier and Simone Padoin. He won promotion again as 5th place due to expansion of Serie A. After just played 6 time in 2007–08 season, he rejoined Vicenza in January 2008.

In January 2010, he signed a contract until end of season with AlbinoLeffe after terminated his contract with Vicenza in mutual consent.

International career
Bernardini was a member of the Italy national under-21 football team that won the 1996 UEFA European Under-21 Championship; he also took part at the Summer Olympics later that year.

Honours
Vicenza
 Serie B Champion: 1999–2000.

Italy under-21
 UEFA European Under-21 Football Championship winner: 1996.

References

External links
 
 aic.football.it
 figc.it
 

Italian footballers
Italy under-21 international footballers
Footballers at the 1996 Summer Olympics
Olympic footballers of Italy
A.S. Roma players
Torino F.C. players
A.C. Perugia Calcio players
U.S. Salernitana 1919 players
L.R. Vicenza players
Atalanta B.C. players
U.C. AlbinoLeffe players
Serie A players
Serie B players
Footballers from Rome
Association football midfielders
1974 births
Living people